Esseneite is a relative rare mineral of the pyroxene group, with formula CaFeAlSiO6. It is the ferric-iron-dominant member. Esseneite is an iron-analogue of other pyroxene-group members, davisite, grossmanite, and kushiroite. It is a metamorphic mineral forming in pyrometamorphic rocks called paralavas, which are formed due to fusing on sedimentary rocks usually in result of coal fires. Esseneite is found in both natural and anthropogenic coal-fire sites.

Esseneite was named for Eric J. Essene (1939-2011), a metamorphic petrologist and Professor of Geosciences at the University of Michigan.

The mineral crystallizes in the monoclinic crystal system with space group C2/c.

References

Pyroxene group
Inosilicates
Calcium minerals
Iron(III) minerals
Aluminium minerals
Monoclinic minerals
Minerals in space group 15